The manca (plural: mancae) is the post-larval juvenile in some crustaceans. The manca stage is the defining characteristic of a clade called Mancoida which comprises all the member of the Peracarida except the Amphipoda. Mancae closely resemble the adult form, but for the absence of the last pair of pereiopods. In some isopods, specifically the family Gnathiidae, the manca stage is a parasite of fish, and is also known as the praniza.

References

Crustaceans
Developmental biology
Larvae